Stadion-Thannhausen was a county located in and around Thannhausen in western Bavaria, Germany. Stadion-Thannhausen was a partition of the county of Stadion, and was mediatised to Bavaria in 1806.

Counts of Stadion-Thannhausen
 Hugo Philip (1741–85)
 John George Joseph Nepomuk (1785–1806)

1806 disestablishments
States and territories established in 1741
Günzburg (district)